Stebbins is a city in Nome Census Area, Alaska, United States. At the 2010 census the population was 556, up from 547 in 2000.

Geography
Stebbins is located at  (63.511893, -162.274632), on the north side of St. Michael Island, which is on the south side of the Norton Sound in western Alaska.

Demographics

Stebbins first appeared on the 1940 U.S. Census as an unincorporated village. It formally incorporated in 1969.

As of the census of 2000, there were 547 people, 123 households, and 104 families residing in the city.  The population density was 15.6 people per square mile (6.0/km2).  There were 134 housing units at an average density of 3.8 per square mile (1.5/km2).  The racial makeup of the city was 5.12% White, 0.18% Black or African American, 93.97% Native American, and 0.73% from two or more races.

Of the 123 households, 64.2% had children under the age of 18 living with them, 47.2% were married couples living together, 11.4% had a female householder with no husband present, and 15.4% were non-families. 12.2% of all households were made up of individuals, and 0.8% had someone living alone who was 65 years of age or older.  The average household size was 4.45 and the average family size was 4.86.

In the city, the age distribution of the population shows 47.2% under the age of 18, 12.4% from 18 to 24, 22.1% from 25 to 44, 13.7% from 45 to 64, and 4.6% who were 65 years of age or older.  The median age was 20 years. For every 100 females, there were 115.4 males.  For every 100 females age 18 and over, there were 114.1 males.

The median income for a household in the city was $23,125, and the median income for a family was $28,214. Males had a median income of $33,125 versus $20,000 for females. The per capita income for the city was $8,249.  About 40.4% of families and 41.9% of the population were below the poverty line, including 45.5% of those under age 18 and 33.3% of those age 65 or over.

Education
Stebbins is served by the Bering Strait School District. Tukurngailnguq School is the only school in town and serves grades K through 12.

City Government

A July 2019 report revealed that all city police officers, including the chief of police, have lengthy criminal records (including domestic violence), and only one has any training.

History

A Russian fort, Redoubt St. Michael, was built at nearby St. Michael by the Russian-American Company in 1833.  The name Stebbins was first recorded in 1900; the Yupik name for the village is Tapraq. The first census in the area, in 1950, listed 80 Yupiks residing in Stebbins. The city was incorporated in 1969.

The Stebbins economy depends on commercial fishing, for herring and other fish, and subsistence fishing, gardening and hunting, supplemented by part-time wage earnings. Hunting is for seal, walrus, caribou, and beluga whale. The city government and school of about 200 students provide the only full-time positions.

The Stebbins/St. Michael Reindeer Corral Project was completed in 1993 for a herd on Stuart Island, just north of Stebbins. The reindeer are currently unmanaged.

References

External links
 Stebbins School Website

Cities in Alaska
Cities in Nome Census Area, Alaska
Populated coastal places in Alaska on the Pacific Ocean